The BAE Systems Skylynx II is an unmanned aerial vehicle (UAV) developed to support US Marine Corps Tier II regiment-level reconnaissance, surveillance and target acquisition missions. The aircraft flew its maiden flight on August 9, 2006 at the Yuma Proving Grounds, Yuma, Arizona. The Skylynx II is equipped with an electro-optical (EO) and infrared imaging system, and during test flights it was able to locate and track human and vehicle targets.

The Skylynx II aircraft is part of an integrated unmanned aerial system that is made up of three aircraft, launcher, ground control station and remote receiver terminal. The system is designed to be operated by six Marines. The entire package can be transported to battlefield sites by two CH-46 Sea Knights or two HMMWVs.

References

"BAE Systems successfully tests Skylynx II unmanned aircraft system", Aerotech News and Review, August 18, 2006.
BAE news release, including image

Unmanned aerial vehicles of the United States
British Aerospace aircraft
2000s United States military reconnaissance aircraft